Cirrhochrista mulleralis is a moth in the family Crambidae. It was described by Henry Legrand in 1957. It is found on the Seychelles, where it has been recorded from Mahé, Praslin, North and Silhouette.

References

Moths described in 1957
Spilomelinae
Moths of Africa